Dolphin class may refer to several classes of submarine named after the dolphin:

 Delfin-class submarine (disambiguation), the name given to a number of different submarine classes
 , four classes of nuclear ballistic missile submarines operated by the Soviet and Russian navies since the 1960s. The submarines are sometimes referred to as the Dolphin class
 Dolfijn or Dolphin-class submarine, a class of four submarines operated by the Royal Netherlands Navy from 1954 until 1992
 , a class of six submarines based on the German Type 209 submarine design and in operation or being built for the Israeli Sea Corps since 1998

See also
 Dolphin (disambiguation)#Ships and aircraft for individual surface vessels and submarines of this name
 , the name of sixteen ships of the Royal Navy, including a submarine base
 , the name of seven ships of the United States Navy, including two submarines